Kajikia is a genus of billfishes found in all subtropical oceans.

Species
The recognized species in this genus are:
 Kajikia albida (Poey, 1860) (white marlin)
 Kajikia audax (Philippi {Krumweide}, 1887) (striped marlin)

References

 
Marine fish genera